Rockne was an American automobile brand produced by the Studebaker Corporation of South Bend, Indiana, from 1932-1933.

Rockne may also refer to:
 Rockne, Texas, an unincorporated community in Bastrop County

People
 Rockne Brubaker (born 1986), American figure skater
 Rockne Krebs (1938–2011), contemporary American artist
 Rockne S. O'Bannon (born 1955), television producer and writer
 Rockne Tarkington (1932–2015), American stage actor
 Anton J. Rockne (1868–1950), American politician
 Knute Rockne (1888–1931), American football player and coach